Miss World 2017, the 67th edition of the Miss World pageant, was held on 18 November 2017 at the Sanya City Arena in China. 118 contestants from all over the world competed for the crown. Stephanie Del Valle of Puerto Rico crowned her successor Manushi Chhillar of India at the end of the event. She is the sixth Indian woman to win Miss World after Priyanka Chopra won in 2000, with India tying Venezuela for the most wins in the pageant's history.

Results

§ People's Choice winner

Continental Queens of Beauty

Order of Announcements

Top 40

Top 15

Top 10

Top 5

Background
Miss World emphasis on a new format, giving greater attraction on social media and interactivity. This new format is called the Head-to-Head Challenge, which will select 20 out of the Top 40 contestants.

Challenge Events

Head-to-Head Challenge
 Advanced to Top 40
 Advanced to Top 40 via a challenge event other than Head-to-Head Challenge
 Advanced to Top 40 via judges' choice
 Advanced to Top 40 via Head-to-Head Challenge, but also a challenge event winner.

Sports
Miss Dominican Republic won the Sports challenge and became the first quarter-finalist of Miss World 2017.

Top Model
Miss Nigeria won the Top Model Competition and became the second quarter-finalist of Miss World 2017.

Talent
Miss Malta won the Talent Competition and became the third quarter-finalist of Miss World 2017.

Multimedia

People's Choice Award

Beauty With A Purpose

Contestants
118 delegates competed in Miss World 2017:

Judges
The judges panel for Miss World 2017 were:
 Julia Morley – Chairman of the Miss World Pageant Organization
 Mike Dixon – British Musical Director, conductor of Royal Philharmonic Orchestra and BBC Concert Orchestra.
 Donna Walsh – Professional dancer and director
 Andrew Minarik – Head of the team for Miss World Hair & Beauty
 Arnold Vegafria – Filipino talent manager of ALV Talent Circuit and current national director of Miss World Philippines
 Zhang Zilin – Miss World 2007 from China
 Yu Wenxia – Miss World 2012 from China
 Rohit Khandelwal – Mister World 2016 from India

Notes

Debuts

Returns
Last competed in 2001
 
 

Last competed in 2010
 

Last competed in 2011
 

Last competed in 2012
 

Last competed in 2013
 

Last competed in 2014
 
 

Last competed in 2015

Designations
 – Anouk Eman was appointed Miss Aruba World 2017 at private ceremony after being selected at a casting call organised by Star Promotion Foundation, the franchise holder for Miss World in Aruba.
 – Renae Martinez was appointed to represent Belize at Miss World 2017 after a casting call was organised by Michael Arnold, national director of Miss World Belize pageant.
 – Aletxa Mueses was crowned Miss Mundo Dominicana 2017 at simple ceremony after being selected at a casting call organised by Diany Mota, the national director of Miss Mundo Dominicana pageant after this years edition was not held due to lack of sponsorship.
 – Fatima Molina was appointed to represent El Salvador at Miss World 2017 at a closed door casting call organized by Telecorporación Salvadoreña, the franchise holder for Miss World in El Salvador.
 – Kisanet Molla was selected Miss World Ethiopia 2017 at a casting call organised by Genet Tsegay, the national director of Miss World Ethiopia pageant.
 – Keti Shekelashvili was appointed to represent Georgia at Miss World 2017 pageant by IC Model Management, the franchise holder for Miss World in Georgia after the national pageant was not held due to undisclosed reasons. Shekelashvili was the 4 th runner-up at the Miss Georgia 2015 pageant.
  – Afua Asieduwaa Akrofi was chosen to represent Ghana at Miss World 2017 by Inna Mariam Patty, the national director of Miss Ghana pageant after she decided to send Margaret Derry Mwintuur, Miss Ghana 2017 to Miss World 2018 pageant as the 2017 edition of the national pageant was to be held in early October leaving no time to prepare the new winner for the Miss World pageant. Akrofi was the 1st runner-up at the Miss Ghana 2015 pageant.
 – Emily Wong was appointed to represent Hong Kong at Miss World 2017 by TVB group, after they reacquired the franchise for Miss World in Hong Kong. Wong was the 2nd runner-up at the Miss Hong Kong 2017 pageant.
 – Wan Ling Lan was chosen to compete at Miss World at 2017 at a casting call. She was also a Macau's representative at Miss Grand International 2015.
 – Magdalena Bieńkowska, Miss Polski 2015 was appointed to compete at Miss World 2017 after Lech Daniłowicz, the national director of Miss Polski pageant was appointed the new license holder for Miss World in Poland. Previously Elzbieta Wierzbicka held the franchise for Miss World in Poland
 – Mihaela Bosca was appointed Miss World Romania 2017 by Ernest Hadrian Böhm, the national director of Miss World Romania pageant after a casting call was organized by ExclusivEvent Agency, the franchise holder for Miss World in Romania.
 – Julitha Kabete was chosen to represent Tanzania at Miss World 2017 after a casting call was organised by Hashim Lundenga, the national director of Miss Tanzania pageant as the 2017 edition of the pageant was not held due to lack of sponsorship. Kabete competed at Miss Tanzania 2016 pageant and was among the Top 5.
 – Patlada Kulphakthanapat was appointed as Miss Thailand World 2017 by Supol Wichianchai, the President of Miss Thailand World Organiztation after the 2017 edition of the pageant was cancelled as a mark of respect on account of the death of the Thai Monarch, King Bhumibol Adulyadej. Kulphakthanapat was the 1st runner-up at the Miss Thailand World 2016 pageant.
 – Melina Carballo was appointed to compete at Miss World 2017 by Antonio Vergara Olmos, the national director of Nuestra Belleza Uruguay pageant after the national pageant was not held due to lack of sponsorship. Carballo competed at Nuestra Belleza Uruguay 2016 and was crowned Miss Grand Uruguay 2016.
 – Ana Carolina Ugarte was appointed Miss Venezuela Mundo 2017 by Osmel Sousa, the national director of Miss Venezuela pageant after Miss Venezuela Mundo pageant was not held for the second consecutive year due to lack of sponsorship and financial crisis in the country. Ugarte represented the state of Monagas at Miss Venezuela 2013 pageant.
 – Đỗ Mỹ Linh was appointed Miss World Vietnam 2017 by Elite Models Vietnam, the franchise holders for Miss World in Vietnam after the Miss World Vietnam pageant was not held for undisclosed reason. Linh was crowned Miss Vietnam 2016.

Replacements
  – Jessia Islam was crowned Miss World Bangladesh 2017 by Antar Showbiz and Omicon Entertainment, the franchise holders for Miss World in Bangladesh after Jannatul Nayeem Avril, the original winner was dethroned for being married before entering the pageant. Islam was the 1st runner-up at the Miss World Bangladesh 2017 pageant.
 – Helina Hewlett was appointed Miss World British Virgin Islands 2017 by Damion Grange, the national director of Miss World British Virgin Islands pageant as a replacement to Khephra Sylvester, Miss British Virgin Islands 2017 who would compete only at Miss Universe 2017 due to the conflicting dates of the two international pageants. Sylvester would have competed at both the pageants otherwise. Hewlett was the 1st runner-up at the Miss British Virgin Islands 2017 pageant.
 – Michèle Ange Minkata was appointed to compete at Miss World 2017 pageant by Solange Ingrid, the national director of Miss Cameroon pageant after Julie Nguimfack, Miss Cameroon 2016 was dethroned on grounds of indiscipline. Nguimfack was denied visa by the US embassy to participate at the last year's event and was supposed to compete at Miss World 2017. Minkata was the 4th runner-up at the Miss Cameroon 2016 pageant.
 – Kristin Amaya was appointed to represent Cayman Islands at Miss World 2017 by Derri Dacres-Lee, the national director of Miss Cayman Islands pageant as a replacement to Anika Conolly, Miss Cayman Islands 2017 who had to withdraw from Miss World 2017 pageant as she didn't meet the minimum age requirement. Amaya was the 1st runner-up at the Miss Cayman Islands 2017 pageant.
  – Aurore Kichenin was appointed Miss World France 2017 by Sylvie Tellier, the national director of Miss France pageant, as a replacement to Alicia Aylies, Miss France 2017 who will only compete at Miss Universe 2017 pageant. Kichenin represented the region of Languedoc-Roussillon at Miss France 2017 and was the 1st runner-up at the pageant.
 – Theodora Soukia, Miss Hellas 2017 was replaced by Maria Psilou, Star Hellas 2017 for undisclosed reasons. Psilou was crowned Star Hellas 2017 at a private casting call organised by Vassilis Prevelakis, the national director of Star Hellas pageant.
 – Virginia Argueta was appointed to compete at Miss World 2017 by Javier Miranda, the national director of Miss Guatemala Mundo pageant as a replacement to Lisbeth Gómez who was earlier appointed to represent Guatemala at Miss World 2017 but resigned due to personal reasons. Gómez was chosen to compete at Miss World pageant so as to allow more preparation time for Elizabeth Gramajo, the new winner of Miss Guatemala Mundo 2017-18 pageant who would be sent to Miss World 2018. Argueta was crowned Miss Universe Guatemala 2016.
 – Felana Tirindraza was appointed to compete at Miss World 2017 by Comité Miss Madagascar, the organizers of Miss Madagascar pageant after Njara Windye Harris, the original winner chose to compete at Miss University Africa 2017 contest. Tirindraza was crowned the 1st runner-up at the Miss Madagascar 2017 pageant.
: Adé van Herdeen was appointed Miss World South Africa 2017, by Melinda Bam, the national director of the Miss South Africa pageant, as a replacement to Demi-Leigh Nel-Peters, Miss South Africa 2017 after Nel-Peters chose to compete at Miss Universe 2017 due to conflicting schedules of the two pageants. van Herdeen was crowned the 1st runner-up at the Miss South Africa 2017 pageant. She then went on to take over the Miss South Africa 2017 title when Nel-Peters won the Miss Universe title.
 – Itır Esen, Miss Turkey World 2017 was replaced by Aslı Sümen, Miss Turkey Universe 2017 by Can Sandikcioglu, the national director of Miss Turkey pageant after Esen was dethroned just hours after her crowning over an unacceptable tweet about the attempted Turkish coup of 2016.
 –  Mary Chibula was appointed to compete at Miss World 2017 by Platinum Events Productions Africa, the franchise holder for Miss World in Zambia after the original winner Louisa Josephs Chingangu was dethroned and Mwangala Ikacana, the 1st runner-up could not compete due to personal reasons. Chibula was crowned the 2nd runner-up at the Miss Zambia 2016 pageant.

Withdrawals
 – No delegate was appointed due to lack of funding and sponsorship.
 – With the Miss Belarus pageant being held bi-annually, the organizers initially appointed the first runner-up Ekaterina Savchuk to represent her country in this year's Miss World, but she eventually withdrew for personal reasons, thus removing her from the official list of contestants.
 – No delegate was appointed due to lack of funding and sponsorship.
 – No delegate was appointed due to lack of funding and sponsorship.
 –  Češka Miss decided to send the nation's delegates to Miss Universe, Miss Earth, and Miss Supranational this year, as the organization relinquished its Miss World license to the new franchise holder, which would be announced at a later date.
 – Laila Da Costa was chosen as national representative for the event, however she could not attend when her entry visa was denied by the Chinese government. 
 – No delegate was appointed due to lack of funding and sponsorship.
 – Begimay Karybekova was chosen as national representative for the event, however she could not attend when her entry visa was denied by the Chinese government.
 – Miss Latvia 2017 pageant was cancelled due to internal problems with the organization and lack of sponsorship.
 – No delegate was appointed, due to internal problems with the organization and lack of sponsorship, following the resignation of the pageant's licensee and national director.
 - No delegate was sent because of the hurricanes that affected the island.
 – No delegate was appointed due to lack of funding and sponsorship.
 – No delegate was appointed due to lack of funding and sponsorship.
 – No delegate was appointed due to lack of funding and sponsorship.
 – No delegate was appointed due to lack of funding and sponsorship.

References

External links
 

Miss World
2017 beauty pageants
Beauty pageants in China
November 2017 events in China
Sanya